The following is a list of notable Kenyan Asians, either persons born in or resident in Kenya with ancestry in South Asia or those descended from Kenyan Asians.

Academia, medicine and science
 Ali S. Asani, professor
 Quassim Cassam, professor
 Sut Jhally, professor
 Azim Nanji, professor
 Urjit Patel, economist
 Sir Nilesh Samani, physician
 Malkiat Singh, author and publisher
 Sir Tejinder Virdee, scientist

Business
 Allidina Visram, pioneer and businessman
 Manu Chandaria, businessman
 Francisco D'Souza, CEO
 Navin Engineer, businessman
 Trushar Khetia, CEO of the Tria Group
 Alibhai Mulla Jeevanjee, settler and businessman
 Naushad Merali, businessman
 Pradeep Paunrana, businessman
 Baloobhai Patel, businessman
 Atul Shah, businessman
 Bhimji Depar Shah, businessman
 Vimal Shah, businessman

Law and politics
 Sonia Birdi, politician 
 Suella Braverman, British politician
 Abdul Majid Cockar, Chief Justice of Kenya
 Isher Dass, politician
 Shams-ud-Deen, politician
 Manilal Ambalal Desai, politician
 Fitz Remedios Santana de Souza, lawyer 
 Achhroo Ram Kapila, lawyer
 Chunilal Madan, Chief Justice of Kenya
 Joseph Murumbi, politician
 Pio Gama Pinto, journalist and politician
 Usha Prashar, Baroness Prashar, politician
 Kalpana Rawal, lawyer and judge
 Shakeel Shabbir, politician
 Mohamed Sheikh, Baron Sheikh, businessman
 Makhan Singh, trade unionist
 Sir Mota Singh, barrister and judge
Rishi Sunak, Prime Minister of the United Kingdom
 Amin Walji, politician

Music and the Arts
 Ruhila Adatia-Sood, journalist
 Liaquat Ahamed, author
 Adeel Akhtar, actor
 Mohamed Amin, photographer
 Kuljit Bhamra, composer
 Samir Bhamra, playwright
 Bali Brahmbhatt, playback singer
 Gurinder Chadha, film director
 Ghalib Shiraz Dhalla, author
 Ravida Din, film producer
 Nitin Ganatra, actor
 Kulvinder Ghir, actor
 Viram Jasani, composer and musician
 Ajaib Kamal, poet
 Shenaaz Nanji, author
 Nadira Naipaul, journalist
 Dev Patel, actor
 Shailja Patel, poet
 Priya Ramrakha, photojournalist
 Deep Roy, actor
 Kiran Shah, actor and stuntman
 Pooja Shah, actress
 Sukhbir Singh, bhangra artist
 Manoj Sood, actor
 Bahadur Tejani, poet
 Moyez G. Vassanji, author
 Ali Velshi, journalist
 Zain Verjee, journalist
 Smriti Vidyarthi, journalist
 Imran Yusuf, comedian
 Amber Rose Revah, actress

Sport
 Rajab Ali, cricketer
 Sabir Butt, squash player
 Dipak Chudasama, cricketer
 Basher Hassan, cricketer
 Aasif Karim, cricketer
 Frasat Ali Mughal, cricketer
 Shekhar Mehta, rally driver
 Tanmay Mishra, cricketer
 Hitesh Modi, cricketer
 Khaaliqa Nimji, squash player
 Dipak Patel, cricketer
 Rakep Patel, cricketer
 Mehmood Quraishy, cricketer
 Zahid Sadiq, cricketer
 Jawahir Shah, cricketer
 Ravindu Shah, cricketer
 Reg Sharma, cricketer
 Mohammad Sheikh, cricketer
 Gurdeep Singh, cricketer
 Joginder Singh, rally driver
 Narendra Thakker, cricketer
 Qasim Umar, cricketer
 Hiren Varaiya, cricketer
 Roger Verdi, footballer
 Shehzana Anwar, archer
 Pushkar Shivkumar Sharma, cricketer.

Other
 Ameer Faisal Alavi, army officer
 Bali Mauladad, Big-game hunter
 Niira Radia, corporate lobbyist
 Girdhari Lal Vidyarthi, journalist
 Sanjay Shah, man who lived in Nairobi Airport for 437 days after being refused an English passport
 Aly Kassam-Remtulla, academic and writer

See also
 Non-resident Indian and person of Indian origin
 Overseas Pakistani
 Indians in Uganda
 Indians in Tanzania
 Indian diaspora in Southeast Africa

References

Kenyan people of Pakistani descent
Kenyan people of Indian descent